The Shellmouth Reservoir (also known as Lake of the Prairies) is a man-made reservoir on the Assiniboine River in Manitoba and Saskatchewan, Canada.

The Shellmouth Dam is a multi-purpose, embankment dam built by the Prairie Farm Rehabilitation Administration (PFRA).

The dam and reservoir are part of a strategy to reduce the risk of flood damage for Winnipeg and other communities along the Assiniboine River. For example, in the 1997 Red River flood, the inflow to the reservoir peaked at  while the outflow never exceeded . The reservoir is also used to supplement flows on the Assiniboine when conditions are dry, ensuring water supply for Brandon, Portage la Prairie, irrigators, and some industries. For example in early August, 2021 the flow in Brandon was a little over 9 cms while the outflow from Shellmouth was 5.7 cms and inflow was less than 0.5 cms. Therefore without the dam the flow in the Assiniboine at Brandon would be a bit under 4 cms.

Asessippi Provincial Park is established around the southern arm of the lake.

Specifications 

Fish species
Fish species include walleye, yellow perch, northern pike, mooneye, burbot, rock bass, brown bullhead, white sucker, shorthead redhorse and common carp. Rock bass are Saskatchewan's only native bass.

Gallery

See also 
List of lakes of Saskatchewan
List of lakes of Manitoba
Portage Diversion (Assiniboine River Floodway)
Red River Floodway

References

External links
Lake of the Prairies Conservation District
Fish Species of Saskatchewan
Lake Levels

Assiniboine River
Cote No. 271, Saskatchewan
Lakes of Manitoba
Lakes of Saskatchewan
Flood control projects
Bodies of water of Parkland Region, Manitoba